The 1904 United States presidential election in South Dakota took place on November 8, 1904. All contemporary 45 states were part of the 1904 United States presidential election. Voters chose four electors to the Electoral College, which selected the president and vice president.

South Dakota was won by the Republican nominees, incumbent President Theodore Roosevelt of New York and his running mate Charles W. Fairbanks of Indiana. The ticket won the state by a margin of 49.42%.

With 71.09% of the popular vote, South Dakota would be Roosevelt's fourth strongest victory in terms of percentage in the popular vote after Vermont and South Dakota's neighboring states North Dakota and Minnesota.

Results

Results by county

See also
 United States presidential elections in South Dakota

Notes

References

South Dakota
1904
1904 South Dakota elections